Murder is a British television crime drama created and written by Robert Jones. Murder is written in a unique style in which all of the protagonists in each episode engage in monologues to camera, giving their version of what happened on the night, as the investigation proceeds from arrest to court hearing to verdict. Four independent films have been written to date, each starring a number of guest artistes. The first, stand-alone film broadcast on 26 August 2012, with a series of three films following on 3 March 2016. The first film was released on DVD on 11 May 2015 via Acorn Media.

Plot
Each episode of Murder is a stand-alone story, which tells the story of the events leading up to and after a murder has been committed. Its unique style includes a style of writing which uses a technique in which none of the characters interact with each other in any one given scene. Each character is seen to break the "fourth wall" and give a monologue to the audience, explaining their involvement and/or role in the crime committed. Although critically well-received, even receiving the BAFTA award for Best Single Drama in 2013, the first stand-alone film did not receive the same level of public acclaim; with six out of nine reviewers for the DVD release giving the film one star.

However, writer and creator Robert Jones has cited this as an inspiration to spend more than three years to bring a second series to screen. The first two films were directed by Birger Larsen, known for his work on The Killing and many other hit Scandinavian dramas. The first episode was broadcast at 10pm on Sunday 26 August 2012, while the second series will be broadcast in an earlier timeslot, at 9pm, on consecutive Thursdays from 3 March 2016. The Radio Times stated in a review of the first episode of series two that Murder is "one of the most original shows on British TV in recent years."

Episode list

Pilot (2012)

Series 1 (2016)

References

External links
 
 

2012 British television series debuts
2016 British television series endings
2010s British drama television series
2010s British anthology television series
BBC television dramas
British crime drama television series
English-language television shows
2010s British crime drama television series